William Irving (17 May 1893 – 25 December 1943) was a German-born American film actor.

Biography
The burly character actor appeared in more than 220 films between 1916 and 1941, often as a "comic heavy" in the comedies of Our Gang or The Three Stooges. Irving also appeared as a cowardly German army cook in All Quiet on the Western Front (1930). He played mostly supporting roles in the silent era, but after the introduction of sound films his appearances got noticeably smaller and he was often uncredited.

On Christmas Day, 1943, Irving was crossing the street at the intersection of Hollywood Boulevard and La Brea Avenue in Los Angeles, California, when he was struck and killed by a hit-and-run driver. His remains were cremated at Pierce Brothers Hollywood. Irving was divorced from his wife, Mildred, at the time of his death. He was survived by a brother.

Selected filmography

 Whose Baby? (1917, Short) - Harold Scull - the Rival
 Till I Come Back to You (1918) - Stroheim
 Someone Must Pay (1919) - Percy Glendenning
 The Heart of a Child (1920) - Perry
 Love's Protegé (1920) - Jack Keith
 Twin Beds (1920) - Andrew Larkin
 Someone in the House (1920) - Percy Glendenning
 Billions (1920) - Frank Manners
 Bell Boy 13 (1923) - Hotel Dining Room Guest (uncredited)
 The Love Trap (1923) - Freddie Rivers
 Gentle Julia (1923) - George Plum
 Love Letters (1924) - Don Crossland
 Pampered Youth (1925) - George Amberson
 Call of the Night (1926) - Chub Biggs
 She's My Baby (1927) - Chuck Callahan
 The Girl in the Pullman (1927) - Oscar McGuff
 Ham and Eggs at the Front (1927) - von Friml
 Coney Island (1928) - Hughey Cooper
 Red Hair (1928) - Demmy
 You're Darn Tootin' (1928, Short) - Musician
 Beautiful But Dumb (1928) - Ward
 The Cameraman (1928) - Photographer (uncredited)
 The Singapore Mutiny (1928) - Huber
 Nothing to Wear (1928) - Detective
 The Rush Hour (1928) - Seasick Shipboard Passenger (uncredited)
 The Bride of the Colorado (1928) - Fritz Mueller
 From Headquarters (1929) - Fritz
 Hearts in Exile (1929) - Rat Catcher
 Song of Love (1929) - Stage Manager (uncredited)
 On the Border (1930) - Dusty
 All Quiet on the Western Front (1930) - Ginger - the Cook (uncredited)
 Rough Waters (1930) - Bill
 Song of the Caballero (1930) - Bernardo
 The Life of the Party (1930) - The 'Yoohoo' Man (uncredited)
 A Soldier's Plaything (1930) - German Actor in Horse (uncredited)
 The Truth About Youth (1930) - Jim Greene (uncredited)
 Her Majesty, Love (1931) - Second Man in Cabaret
 Manhattan Parade (1931) - Suit of Armor (uncredited)
 State's Attorney (1932) - Drunken Tenant in Hallway (uncredited)
 Her Mad Night (1932) - Jury Foreman (uncredited)
 A Farewell to Arms (1932) - Frederic's Friend - Frustrated Opera Singer (uncredited)
 Footlight Parade (1933)
 Three Little Pigskins (1934) - photographer (uncredited)
 Mike Fright (1934)
 It Happened One Night (1934)
 Pop Goes the Easel (1935)
 Hoi Polloi (1935)
 Slippery Silks (1936)
 Mr. Deeds Goes to Town (1936)
 Grips, Grunts and Groans (1937)
 Playing the Ponies (1937)
 Wee Wee Monsieur (1938) - Captain Gorgonzola
 Ninotchka (1939)
 A Ducking They Did Go (1939)
 The Great Dictator (1940)

References

External links

1893 births
1943 deaths
Male actors from Hamburg
American male film actors
American male silent film actors
German emigrants to the United States
20th-century American male actors
Our Gang